Nemophora parvella is a species of moth of the  family Adelidae. It is known from the Republic of Congo and Sierra Leone.

References

Adelidae
Moths of Africa
Lepidoptera of the Republic of the Congo
Lepidoptera of West Africa